The 2003–04 VfL Bochum season was the 66th season in club history.

Review and events

Matches

Legend

Bundesliga

DFB-Pokal

DFB-Ligapokal

Squad

Squad and statistics

Squad, appearances and goals scored

Transfers

Summer

In:

Out:

Winter

In:

Out:

VfL Bochum II

Sources

External links
 2003–04 VfL Bochum season at Weltfussball.de 
 2003–04 VfL Bochum season at kicker.de 
 2003–04 VfL Bochum season at Fussballdaten.de 

Bochum
VfL Bochum seasons